Rheinheimera tuosuensis is a Gram-negative and non-spore-forming bacterium from the genus of Rheinheimera which has been isolated from the Tuosu Lake from the Qaidam Basin in China.

References 

Chromatiales
Bacteria described in 2014